Kelinlar qoʻzgʻoloni may refer to:
 Kelinlar qoʻzgʻoloni (film), a 1984 Uzbek film.
 Kelinlar qoʻzgʻoloni (play), a play by Said Ahmad.